Salvatore Ficarra (born 27 May 1971, in Palermo) and Valentino Picone (born 23 March 1971, in Palermo) are an Italian comedy duo who work on stage, films, television and books as Ficarra e Picone.

Life and career 
They started in 1993 along with Salvatore Borrello as a comedy trio, performing together on stage as "Chiamata Urbana Urgente".

In 1998, the two remaining members began to use their surnames: Ficarra & Picone.

In 2000, Ficarra e Picone made their film debut with Ask Me If I'm Happy by Aldo, Giovanni & Giacomo, and two years later they made the first film as main actors, Nati stanchi.

On 25 April 2005, ficarra and Picone were the TV anchor-men four episodes of Striscia la notizia to which they collaborated from 27 March 2006 up to 5 December 2020.

In 2007 they debuted as directors alongside Gianbattista Avellino with the film Il 7 e l'8, for which they were nominated to David di Donatello for Best New Director and to Silver Ribbon in the same category.

Also in 2007 they were featured as comic characters in the story Zio Paperone e il rapimento teatrale (trad. Uncle Scrooge and the Theatrical Kidnapping), published in the issue 2678 of Topolino.

Filmography

Film
 Nati stanchi (2002)
 Il 7 e l'8 (2007)
 La matassa (2009)
 Baarìa (2009)
 Women vs. Men (2011)
 It May Be Love But It Doesn't Show (2011)
 Belluscone: A Sicilian Story (2014)
 Andiamo a quel paese (2014)
 It's the Law (2017)
 Once Upon a Time... in Bethlehem (2019)

TV series
 Framed! A Sicilian Murder Mystery (2022-)

Bibliography 
 2003 – Vuoti a perdere, Kowalsky editore
 2004 – Stanchi, Kowalsky editore
 2005 – Diciamoci la verità, Mondadori
 2007 – Sono cose che capitano, Mondadori

Awards 
 2007 – Premio Charlot – Striscia la notizia
 2007 – Capri Exploit Award
 2009 – Premio Barocco

References

External links 
 
 
 

Italian male film actors
Film people from Palermo
Male actors from Palermo
Italian male stage actors
Living people
Italian comedy duos
Italian television presenters
Italian comedians
Italian male writers
Year of birth missing (living people)
Mass media people from Palermo